Igualada Hoquei Club is a Catalan roller hockey club based in Igualada, Catalonia, Spain. The Pavelló Poliesportiu Les Comes, with a capacity of 3,000 seats, currently serves as its pavilion.

History

The club was founded in 1950. It played in the top nacional category from 1955 to 1964, 1969 to 1973, and from 1984 to nowadays. The team enjoyed its golden era through the 1990s, winning six European Leagues, five European Supercups, five Spanish championships and four national cups between 1989 and 1999. CN Igualada's women's rink hockey team, which would become Igualada HC's women's section in 2008, also won seven Spanish championships between 1993 and 2000. This women's club would split from Igualada HC in 2013 for creating a new Igualada Femení CHP.

Season by season

Titles
OK Liga: 5
1988–89, 1991–92, 1993–94, 1994–95, 1996–97
Copa del Rey: 2
1991–92, 1992–93
Supercopa de España: 1
1993–94
European Cup/Champions League: 6
1992–93, 1993–94, 1994–95, 1995–96, 1997–98, 1998–99
Continental Cup: 5
1993, 1994, 1995, 1998, 1999
Catalan leagues: 4
1991–92, 1992–93, 1993–94, 1998-99

References

External links
Igualada HC Official Website

Catalan rink hockey clubs
Sports clubs established in 1950
Igualada